Azerbaijani National Council was the first delegated legislative body of the Azerbaijan Democratic Republic (ADR) from 27 May 1918 to 17 June 1918 and again from 16 November 1918 to 3 December 1918. It was succeeded by the Parliament, a legislative body formed through nationwide general elections.

Background 
After the February Revolution like many ethnic minorities of the shrinking Russian Empire, Azeris also began to form movements aimed at political autonomy from Russia. In the provinces and districts where Azeris constituted considerable population local Muslim National Councils (MNC) were formed. On March 27, 1917, delegates of MNCs gathered to establish the Temporary Executive Committee for the MNCs. Mammad Hasan Hajinski became head of this committee, which also included Mahammad Amin Rasulzade, Alimardan bey Topchubashev, Fatali Khan Khoyski, and other founders of the future Azerbaijan Democratic Republic. After the October Revolution the South Caucasus was separated from mainland Russia, hence the Transcaucasian Sejm formed in Tbilisi proclaimed independence of the Transcaucasian Democratic Federative Republic. Azerbaijanis formed the largest faction of the same numbering 44 members, and headed by Mammed Amin Rasulzade. These 44 members represented four different political parties and blocks: Musavat and neutral Democrats; the Muslim Socialist Bloc; Ittihad-i Muslimin (or simply Ittihad; Union of Muslims of Russia); and the Muslim Social Democratic Party.

Formation 
When the 31 March–2 April massacres took place in Baku, the Temporary Executive Committee was crushed, its factual leader Alimardan bey Topchubashev was arrested, and the Azeri intelligentsia was driven out of Baku, Tbilisi became the headquarters of the Azerbaijani National Movement. After the Transcaucasian Democratic Federative Republic fell on 26 May 1918 and its bodies were dissolved, the Azerbaijani faction of the Sejm was renamed to Azerbaijani National Council (NC). It immediately undertook parliamentary functions and proclaimed the foundation of Azerbaijani Democratic Republic on 28 May 1918. On 16 June the Azerbaijani National Council moved to Ganja and declared it Azerbaijan's temporary capital awaiting the fall of the Baku Commune. The Council met with resistance of ultra-nationalists who accused it of being too left-wing; and intolerance of Ottoman Commander Nuru Pasha. It had to be abolished the next day, leaving all power to the Council of Ministers led by Fatali Khan Khoyski.

Second Convocation 
After the defeat of the Ottoman Empire in World War I and the withdrawal of Ottoman forces from Azerbaijan, the power of the ultra-nationalists once backed by Nuru Pasha weakened. This allowed for the Azerbaijani National Council to be re-established and start negotiations with the British occupation forces. The Council was completely abolished after the opening of the Parlaman on 7 December 1918. The Parliament of ADR included the representatives of majority Azerbaijani parties as well as MPs from Armenian, Russian, Jewish, German and Polish minorities of Azerbaijan and representatives of trade unions.

Members of the Azerbaijani National Council

References

1918 establishments in Azerbaijan
1918 disestablishments
Politics of Azerbaijan
Azerbaijan Democratic Republic
Azerbaijan
Constituent assemblies
Russian Revolution